Arhopala aronya is a species of butterfly in the family Lycaenidae first described by William Chapman Hewitson in 1869. Its forewing length is 17–18 mm. It is endemic to the Philippines. It is uncommon or local.

Subspecies
A. a. aronya Hewitson, [1869]
A. a. natsumiae H. Hayashi, [1981]
A. a. mangyan Schroeder & Treadaway, [2000]
A. a. kalinga Schroeder & Treadaway, [2000]

Range
The nominotypical subspecies is distributed on Dinagat, Leyte and Mindanao islands. The subspecies A. a. mangyan is on Mindoro Island and A. a. kalinga is on Luzon and Marinduque islands. The subspecies A. a. natsumiae is found on Negros Island.

Synonyms
Amblypodia aronya Hewitson, [1869]: 14e, pl. 3b, figs 45, 46.
Arhopala aronya (Hewitson); Bethune-Baker, 1903: 57; D'Abrera, 1986: 566; Treadaway, 1995: 75; Takanami & Seki, Pl. C, consulted, 14.xi.2011.
Narathura aronya (Hewitson); Evans, 1957: 99.

References

, 1986. Butterflies of the Oriental Region, Part III: pp. 536–672. Melbourne.
, 1903. A revision of the Amblypodia group of butterflies of the family Lycaenidae. Transactions of the Zoological Society of London. 17 (1): 3-164, 5 pls.
, 1957. A revision of the Arhopala group of oriental lycaenidae (Lepidoptera: Rhopalocera) Bulletin of the British Museum (Natural History), Entomology Series, 5 (3): 85-141.
, 1981: New Lycaenid Butterflies from the Philippines. Tyô to Ga 32 (1/2): 63–82. Abstract and full article: .
, 1863–1878. Illustrations of diurnal Lepidoptera, Lycaenidae. Text Plates London, van Vorst, x + 229 pp. etc.

, 1995. Checklist of the butterflies of the Philippine Islands (Lepidoptera: Rhopalocera) Nachrichten des Entomologischen Vereins Apollo Suppl. 14: 7–118.
, 2012: Revised checklist of the butterflies of the Philippine Islands (Lepidoptera: Rhopalocera). Nachrichten des Entomologischen Vereins Apollo, Suppl. 20: 1-64.

Arhopala
Lepidoptera of the Philippines
Butterflies described in 1869
Taxa named by William Chapman Hewitson